Acompocoris pygmaeus is a species of minute pirate bug in the family Anthocoridae. It is found in Europe and Northern Asia (excluding China) and North America. It is associated with Scots pine.

References

Further reading

External links
Acompocoris pygmaeus images at  Consortium for the Barcode of Life

Anthocoridae
Articles created by Qbugbot
Insects described in 1807